Darganov is a rural locality (a khutor) in Vypasnovskoye Rural Settlement, Kotelnikovsky District, Volgograd Oblast, Russia. The population was 151 as of 2010. There are 3 streets.

Geography 
Darganov is located 115 km east of Kotelnikovo (the district's administrative centre) by road. Sharnut is the nearest rural locality.

References 

Rural localities in Kotelnikovsky District